Saint-Denœux is a commune in the Pas-de-Calais department in the Hauts-de-France region of France.

Geography
Saint-Denœux is located 6 miles (9 km) east of Montreuil-sur-Mer at the junction of the D149 and D153 roads.

Population

Places of interest
 The church of St. Austreberthe, dating from the sixteenth century
 A watermill

See also
 Communes of the Pas-de-Calais department

References

Saintdenoeux